The WVSSAC Super Six Football Championships is a series of high school football games, typically held on the first weekend of December, that determine the high school champions of the U.S. state of West Virginia. The tournaments that lead to the championship games, as well as regular-season competition, are governed by the West Virginia Secondary School Activities Commission (WVSSAC). The games have the name of "Super Six" because six teams play in the state's three championship games. The Championship games are held at Wheeling Island Stadium in Wheeling, a two-day affair, with one game on Friday and two on Saturday.

History
The WVSSAC began conducting state football championships in 1937. Throughout its history, the competition has been divided into classes based on enrollment. The history of classifications is as follows:
1903-1936: Prior to WVSSAC or sportswriter involvement: Single-class system, games arranged by individual teams, 1903 & 1907 Fairmont Senior Source: "Knights of the Laughing Waters" by George W. Ramsey, Jr., 1915 Source: "Buckhannon Record" newspaper November 1915, 1916-1936 Source: "History of Sports in West Virginia" by Doug Huff.  1909, 1912 Source: "Huntington Advertiser" newspaper.  1908 & 1913 "Wheeling Genealogical Society. 
1916-1956: Colored School State Champions.  Before the historic Brown vs. Board of Education Supreme Court ruling, schools, and football games, were segregated. African Americans were forced to play in their own league.  The West Virginia Athletic Union governed African American athletics during this time. 
1937–1946: Single-class system. Champion was named by the West Virginia Sportswriters Association.
1947–1954: Two-class system. Schools were placed in Class A or B based on enrollment.
1955–1957: Three-class system, based on enrollment, with Class B, Class A or AA based on enrollment.
1958–present: Three-class system, based on enrollment, with Classes A, AA and AAA.

In 1947 in Class B, 1947 and 1948 in Class A, and 1955 and 1956 in Class AA, there were no actual championship games. Those championships was awarded based on ratings. Class B was only in use from 1947 through 1957.

From 1947 to 1954, there were only two classes; Class A (big schools) and Class B (small schools).  From 1955 to 1957, there were three classes; Class AA (big schools), Class A (medium sized schools) and Class B (small schools).  From 1958 to the present there have been three classes as well, however the names have been changed to; Class AAA (big schools), Class AA (medium sized schools) and Class A (small schools).

WV Champions by Popular Acclaim

Single Class

WV Colored State Football Champions
It is almost surreal to think that, not that many years ago, African American students were barred from playing football with White Americans.  This changed in 1954 with a supreme court decision, Brown vs. Board of Education, overturning school segregation.  The black schools were governed by the WV Athletic Union but did not receive as consistent media attention as their white counterparts.  This makes research difficult.  Information on the Colored State Football Champions has been provided by Robert Bonner, WV high school football researcher.  More will be entered as the information becomes available.

Single Class

WV Catholic Schools State Football Champions
Prior to 1977, private schools were not allowed to compete in post season play-offs.

Single Class

WV SPORTS WRITERS VOTE

Single Class

TWO CLASS SYSTEM (A, B) 1947-1954 / WVSSAC Ratings

Class A (two classes A, B, 1947-1954)

Class B (two classes A, B, 1947-1954)

THREE CLASS SYSTEM (AA, A, B) 1955-1957 / WVSSAC Ratings

Class AA (three classes AA, A, B, 1955-1957)

Class A (three classes AA, A, B, 1955-1957)

Class B (three classes AA, A, B, 1955-1957)

THREE CLASS SYSTEM (AAA, AA, A) 1958-PRESENT / WVSSAC Ratings

Class A (three classes AAA, AA, A, 1958-present)

Class AA (three classes AAA, AA, A, 1958-present)

Class AAA (three classes AAA, AA, A, 1958-present)

Schools with multiple championships
59 schools have won multiple Football Championships, 30 of which have since been consolidated. Parkersburg High School and Wheeling Central Catholic High School are tied with the most titles, with 16.

WVSSAC State Football Champions

See also
West Virginia Secondary School Activities Commission

External links
West Virginia Secondary School Activities Commission - Football

Sports in West Virginia